Nurabad (also romanized as Nūrābād) is a city in and capital of Delfan County, Lorestan Province, Iran. At the 2006 census, its population was 56,404, in 12,232 families.

The city is populated by Kurds.

References

Cities in Lorestan Province
Towns and villages in Delfan County
Kurdish settlements in Iran